The Compact King Crimson is a compilation of songs by the British progressive rock band King Crimson, selected by Robert Fripp from the two different eras of the band.

The cover art features the Fergus Hall painting Il Divino. Paintings by Hall emblazoned the previous King Crimson compilation, A Young Person's Guide to King Crimson.

Track listing

LP/Cassette version

Side one

Side two

Side three

Side four

CD version

Personnel
Robert Fripp – guitars, devices (all tracks)
Adrian Belew – guitar, lead vocals (on "Discipline", "Thela Hun Ginjeet", "Matte Kudasai", "Three of a Perfect Pair", "Frame by Frame", "Sleepless", Heartbeat", "Elephant Talk")
Bill Bruford – drums, percussion (on "Discipline", "Thela Hun Ginjeet", "Matte Kudasai", "Three of a Perfect Pair", "Frame by Frame", "Sleepless", Heartbeat", "Elephant Talk", "Red")
Tony Levin – Chapman Stick, basses, backing vocals (on "Discipline", "Thela Hun Ginjeet", "Matte Kudasai", "Three of a Perfect Pair", "Frame by Frame", "Sleepless", Heartbeat", "Elephant Talk")
Michael Giles – drums, percussion, vocals (on "21st Century Schizoid Man", "I Talk to the Wind", "Epitaph", "Cat Food", "The Court of the Crimson King")
Greg Lake – lead vocals, basses (on "21st Century Schizoid Man", "I Talk to the Wind", "Epitaph", "Cat Food", "The Court of the Crimson King")
Ian McDonald – woodwinds, reeds, keyboards, Mellotron, vocals (on "21st Century Schizoid Man", "I Talk to the Wind", "Epitaph", "The Court of the Crimson King")
John Wetton – bass (on "Red")

Additional personnel

Peter Giles – bass (on "Cat Food")
Keith Tippett – piano (on "Cat Food")

References

1986 compilation albums
King Crimson compilation albums